In optics, a Gaussian beam is a beam of electromagnetic radiation with high monochromaticity whose amplitude envelope in the transverse plane is given by a Gaussian function; this also implies a Gaussian intensity (irradiance) profile. This fundamental (or TEM00) transverse Gaussian mode describes the intended output of most (but not all) lasers, as such a beam can be focused into the most concentrated spot. When such a beam is refocused by a lens, the transverse phase dependence is altered; this results in a different Gaussian beam. The electric and magnetic field amplitude profiles along any such circular Gaussian beam (for a given wavelength and polarization) are determined by a single parameter: the so-called waist . At any position  relative to the waist (focus) along a beam having a specified , the field amplitudes and phases are thereby determined as detailed below.

At any point along the beam  these modes include the same Gaussian factor as the fundamental Gaussian mode multiplying the additional geometrical factors for the specified mode.

Although there are other possible modal decompositions, these families of solutions are the most useful for problems involving compact beams, that is, where the optical power is rather closely confined along an axis. Even when a laser is not operating in the fundamental Gaussian mode, its power will generally be found among the lowest-order modes using these decompositions, as the spatial extent of higher order modes will tend to exceed the bounds of a laser's resonator (cavity). "Gaussian beam" normally implies radiation confined to the fundamental (TEM00) Gaussian mode.

Mathematical form

The Gaussian beam is a transverse electromagnetic (TEM) mode. The mathematical expression for the electric field amplitude is a solution to the paraxial Helmholtz equation. Assuming polarization in the  direction and propagation in the  direction, the electric field in phasor (complex) notation is given by:

where

 is the radial distance from the center axis of the beam,
 is the axial distance from the beam's focus (or "waist"),
 is the imaginary unit,
, the electric field amplitude (and phase) at the origin,
 is the waist radius,

There is also an understood time dependence  multiplying such phasor quantities; the actual field at a point in time and space is given by the real part of that complex quantity.

Since this solution relies on the paraxial approximation, it is not accurate for very strongly diverging beams. The above form is valid in most practical cases, where .

The corresponding intensity (or irradiance) distribution is given by

where the constant  is the wave impedance of the medium in which the beam is propagating. For free space,  ≈ 377 Ω.  is the intensity at the center of the beam at its waist. 

If  is the total power of the beam,

Evolving beam width

At a position  along the beam (measured from the focus), the spot size parameter  is given by a hyperbolic relation:

where

The radius of the beam , at any position  along the beam, is related to the full width at half maximum (FWHM) of the intensity distribution at that position according to:

Wavefront curvature
The curvature of the wavefronts is largest at the Rayleigh distance, on either side of the waist, crossing zero at the waist itself. The curvature is often expressed in terms of its reciprocal, the radius of curvature; for a fundamental Gaussian beam the curvature at position  is given by:

so the radius of curvature  is 

Being the reciprocal of the curvature, the radius of curvature reverses sign and is infinite at the beam waist where the curvature goes through zero.

Gouy phase
The Gouy phase is a phase advance gradually acquired by a beam around the focal region. At position  the Gouy phase of a fundamental Gaussian beam is given by

The Gouy phase results in an increase in the apparent wavelength near the waist.  Thus the phase velocity in that region formally exceeds the speed of light. That paradoxical behavior must be understood as a near-field phenomenon where the departure from the phase velocity of light (as would apply exactly to a plane wave) is very small except in the case of a beam with large numerical aperture, in which case the wavefronts' curvature (see previous section) changes substantially over the distance of a single wavelength. In all cases the wave equation is satisfied at every position.

The sign of the Gouy phase depends on the sign convention chosen for the electric field phasor.

For a fundamental Gaussian beam, the Gouy phase results in a net phase discrepancy with respect to the speed of light amounting to  radians (thus a phase reversal) as one moves from the far field on one side of the waist to the far field on the other side. This phase variation is not observable in most experiments. It is, however, of theoretical importance and takes on a greater range for higher-order Gaussian modes.

Elliptical and astigmatic beams
Many laser beams have an elliptical cross-section. Also common are beams with waist positions which are different for the two transverse dimensions, called astigmatic beams. The Gouy phase is a single value calculated correctly by summing the contribution from each dimension, with a Gouy phase within the range  contributed by each dimension.

An elliptical beam will invert its ellipticity ratio as it propagates from the far field to the waist. The dimension which was the larger far from the waist, will be the smaller near the waist.

Beam parameters 

The geometric dependence of the fields of a Gaussian beam are governed by the light's wavelength  (in the dielectric medium, if not free space) and the following beam parameters, all of which are connected as detailed in the following sections.

Beam waist

The shape of a Gaussian beam of a given wavelength  is governed solely by one parameter, the beam waist . This is a measure of the beam size at the point of its focus ( in the above equations) where the beam width  (as defined above) is the smallest (and likewise where the intensity on-axis is the largest). From this parameter the other parameters describing the beam geometry are determined. This includes the Rayleigh range  and asymptotic beam divergence , as detailed below.

Rayleigh range and confocal parameter

The Rayleigh distance or Rayleigh range  is determined given a Gaussian beam's waist size:

Here  is the wavelength of the light,  is the index of refraction. At a distance from the waist equal to the Rayleigh range , the width  of the beam is  larger than it is at the focus where , the beam waist. That also implies that the on-axis intensity there is one half of the peak intensity (at ). That point along the beam also happens to be where the wavefront curvature is greatest.

The distance between the two points  is called the confocal parameter or depth of focus of the beam.

Beam divergence

Although the tails of a Gaussian function never actually reach zero, for the purposes of the following discussion the "edge" of a beam is considered to be the radius where . This means that far from the waist, the beam "edge" (in the above sense) is cone-shaped. The angle between that cone (whose ) and the beam axis defines the divergence of the beam:

In the paraxial case, as we have been considering,  (in radians) is then approximately

The total angular spread of the diverging beam, or apex angle of the above-described cone, is then given by

That cone then contains 86% of the Gaussian beam's total power.

Because the divergence is inversely proportional to the spot size, for a given wavelength , a Gaussian beam that is focused to a small spot diverges rapidly as it propagates away from the focus. Conversely, to minimize the divergence of a laser beam in the far field (and increase its peak intensity at large distances) it must have a large cross-section at the waist (and thus a large diameter where it is launched, since  is never less than ). This relationship between beam width and divergence is a fundamental characteristic of diffraction, and of the Fourier transform which describes Fraunhofer diffraction. A beam with any specified amplitude profile also obeys this inverse relationship, but the fundamental Gaussian mode is a special case where the product of beam size at focus and far-field divergence is smaller than for any other case.

Since the Gaussian beam model uses the paraxial approximation, it fails when wavefronts are tilted by more than about 30° from the axis of the beam.

Laser beam quality is quantified by the beam parameter product (BPP). For a Gaussian beam, the BPP is the product of the beam's divergence and waist size . The BPP of a real beam is obtained by measuring the beam's minimum diameter and far-field divergence, and taking their product. The  for a Gaussian beam is one. All real laser beams have  values greater than one, although very high quality beams can have values very close to one.

The numerical aperture of a Gaussian beam is defined to be , where  is the index of refraction of the medium through which the beam propagates. This means that the Rayleigh range is related to the numerical aperture by

Power and intensity

Power through an aperture 
With a beam centered on an aperture, the power  passing through a circle of radius  in the transverse plane at position  is

where

is the total power transmitted by the beam.

For a circle of radius , the fraction of power transmitted through the circle is

Similarly, about 90% of the beam's power will flow through a circle of radius , 95% through a circle of radius , and 99% through a circle of radius .

Peak intensity 
The peak intensity at an axial distance  from the beam waist can be calculated as the limit of the enclosed power within a circle of radius , divided by the area of the circle  as the circle shrinks:

The limit can be evaluated using L'Hôpital's rule:

Complex beam parameter

The spot size and curvature of a Gaussian beam as a function of  along the beam can also be encoded in the complex beam parameter  given by:

Introducing this complication leads to a simplification of the Gaussian beam field equation as shown below. It can be seen that the reciprocal of  contains the wavefront curvature and relative on-axis intensity in its real and imaginary parts, respectively:

The complex beam parameter simplifies the mathematical analysis of Gaussian beam propagation, and especially in the analysis of optical resonator cavities using ray transfer matrices.

Then using this form, the earlier equation for the electric (or magnetic) field is greatly simplified.

where 

Beam optics

When a gaussian beam propagates through a thin lens, the outgoing beam is also a (different) gaussian beam, provided that the beam travels along the cylindrical symmetry axis of the lens.  The focal length of the lens , the beam waist radius , and beam waist position  of the incoming beam can be used to determine the beam waist radius  and  position  of the outgoing beam.

Lens equation
As derived by Saleh and Teich, the relationship between the ingoing and outgoing beams can be found by considering the phase that is added to each point  of the gaussian beam as it travels through the lens.  An alternative approach due to Self is to consider the effect of a thin lens on the gaussian beam  wavefronts.

The exact solution to the above problem is expressed simply in terms of the magnification 

where

An equivalent expression for the beam position  is

This last expression makes clear that the ray optics thin lens equation is recovered in the limit that .  It can also be noted that if  then the incoming beam is "well collimated" so that .

Beam focusing
In some applications it is desirable to use a converging lens to focus a laser beam to a very small spot.  Mathematically, this implies minimization of the magnification .  If the beam size is constrained by the size of available optics, this is typically best achieved by sending the largest possible collimated beam through a small focal length lens, i.e. by maximizing  and minimizing .  In this situation, it is justifiable to make the approximation , implying that  and yielding the result .  This result is often presented in the form

where

which is found after assuming that the medium has index of refraction  and substituting .

Wave equation

where  is the speed of light in the medium, and  could either refer to the electric or magnetic field vector, as any specific solution for either determines the other. The Gaussian beam solution is valid only in the paraxial approximation, that is, where wave propagation is limited to directions within a small angle of an axis.

Using this form along with the paraxial approximation,  can then be essentially neglected.

Substituting this solution into the wave equation above yields the paraxial approximation to the scalar wave equation:

Writing the wave equations in the light-cone coordinates returns this equation without utilizing any approximation. There are many other solutions. As solutions to a linear system, any combination of solutions (using addition or multiplication by a constant) is also a solution. The fundamental Gaussian happens to be the one that minimizes the product of minimum spot size and far-field divergence, as noted above. In seeking paraxial solutions, and in particular ones that would describe laser radiation that is not in the fundamental Gaussian mode, we will look for families of solutions with gradually increasing products of their divergences and minimum spot sizes. Two important orthogonal decompositions of this sort are the Hermite–Gaussian or Laguerre-Gaussian modes, corresponding to rectangular and circular symmetry respectively, as detailed in the next section. With both of these, the fundamental Gaussian beam we have been considering is the lowest order mode.

Higher-order modes

Hermite-Gaussian modes 

 

In this form, the first factor is just a normalizing constant to make the set of  orthonormal. It also contains part of the Gouy phase. The third factor is a pure phase which enhances the Gouy phase shift for higher orders .

The fourth factor is the Hermite polynomial of order  ("physicists' form", i.e. ), while the fifth accounts for the Gaussian amplitude fall-off , although this isn't obvious using the complex  in the exponent.

Hermite-Gaussian modes are typically designated "TEMlm"; the fundamental Gaussian beam may thus be referred to as TEM00 (where TEM is transverse electro-magnetic).

Given that ,  and  have the same definitions as for the fundamental Gaussian beam described above. It can be seen that with  we obtain the fundamental Gaussian beam described earlier (since ). However, there is a change in the evolution of the modes' Gouy phase over :

Hermite Gaussian modes, with their rectangular symmetry, are especially suited for the modal analysis of radiation from lasers whose cavity design is asymmetric in a rectangular fashion. On the other hand, lasers and systems with circular symmetry can better be handled using the set of Laguerre-Gaussian modes introduced in the next section.

Laguerre-Gaussian modes 

Beam profiles which are circularly symmetric (or lasers with cavities that are  cylindrically symmetric) are often best solved using the  Laguerre-Gaussian modal decomposition. These functions are written in cylindrical coordinates using generalized Laguerre polynomials. Each transverse mode is again labelled using two integers, in this case the radial index  and the azimuthal index  which can be positive or negative (or zero):
 

where  are the generalized Laguerre polynomials.  is a required normalization constant:
.

 and  have the same definitions as above. As with the higher-order Hermite-Gaussian modes the magnitude of the Laguerre-Gaussian modes' Gouy phase shift is exaggerated by the factor :

where in this case the combined mode number . As before, the transverse amplitude variations are contained in the last two factors on the upper line of the equation, which again includes the basic Gaussian drop off in  but now multiplied by a Laguerre polynomial. The effect of the rotational mode number , in addition to affecting the Laguerre polynomial, is mainly contained in the phase factor , in which the beam profile is advanced (or retarded) by  complete  phases in one rotation around the beam (in ). This is an example of an optical vortex of topological charge , and can be associated with the orbital angular momentum of light in that mode.

Ince-Gaussian modes 

In elliptic coordinates, one can write the higher-order modes using Ince polynomials. The even and odd Ince-Gaussian modes are given by

 are the even Ince polynomials of order  and degree  where  is the ellipticity parameter.

Hypergeometric-Gaussian modes 

There is another important class of paraxial wave modes in cylindrical coordinates in which the complex amplitude is proportional to a confluent hypergeometric function.

These modes have a singular phase profile and are eigenfunctions of the photon orbital angular momentum. Their intensity profiles are characterized by a single brilliant ring; like Laguerre–Gaussian modes, their intensities fall to zero at the center (on the optical axis) except for the fundamental (0,0) mode. A mode's complex amplitude can be written in terms of the normalized (dimensionless) radial coordinate  and the normalized longitudinal coordinate  as follows:

Some subfamilies of hypergeometric-Gaussian (HyGG) modes can be listed as the modified Bessel-Gaussian modes, the modified exponential Gaussian modes, and the modified Laguerre–Gaussian modes.

The set of hypergeometric-Gaussian modes is overcomplete and is not an orthogonal set of modes. In spite of its complicated field profile, HyGG modes have a very simple profile at the beam waist:

See also
 Bessel beam
 Tophat beam
 Laser beam profiler
 Quasioptics

Notes

References

 Chapter 5, "Optical Beams," pp. 267.

 Chapter 3, "Beam Optics," pp. 80–107.
 Chapter 16.

External links
 Gaussian Beam Optics Tutorial, Newport

Physical optics
Laser science
Electromagnetic radiation